Sharan Kaur is an Indian actress active in Punjabi cinema. 
She played the leading female role in Munda Faridkotia and in 2022 Punjabi film Shareek2.

Sharan Kaur Recently Worked With Dev Kharoud And Jimmy Shergill in Shareek 2 Directed By Navaniat Singh 

She played the leading female role in Munda Faridkotia And Punjabi film Shareek2.

Early life and modelling career 
Sharan Kaur was born in Gurdaspur
 and is a Punjabi film actress.
She studied in Panjab University, Chandigarh. She moved to Mumbai in 2015. She has acted in the TV serials Thapki Pyar Ki and Savitri Devi College & Hospital. She received the best debut actress award at the PTC Punjabi Film Awards 2020.

Filmography

Awards and nominations

References

External links 
  
 

Living people
21st-century Indian actresses
Indian female models
Indian film actresses
Actresses in Hindi cinema
Actresses in Punjabi cinema
Actresses from Mumbai
Actresses from Punjab, India
Year of birth missing (living people)